Sabina Baltag (born 24 April 2001) is a Romanian weightlifter. She won the gold medal in the 53kg event at the 2018 Summer Youth Olympics held in Buenos Aires, Argentina. In 2018, she also won the gold medal in the youth women's 53kg event at the European Youth Weightlifting Championships held in San Donato Milanese, Italy.

References

External links 
 

Living people
2001 births
Place of birth missing (living people)
Romanian female weightlifters
Weightlifters at the 2018 Summer Youth Olympics
Youth Olympic gold medalists for Romania
21st-century Romanian women